Pope Pius XII and the Church in China involves relations of the Holy See with China from 1939 to 1958. The Vatican recognized Chinese rites in 1939, elevated the first Chinese cardinal in 1946, and established a Chinese hierarchy.

As part of its extending domination over Chinese society, in the early 1950s, the government persecuted the Catholic Church and its people, and nearly destroyed it, suppressing the religious freedom of its people. In 1957, it supported the establishment of what it called a patriotic, socialist Chinese Church, which was independent of Rome.

Chinese rites 
For centuries, the Catholic Church did not recognize the Chinese Confucian customs of honouring deceased family members and tried to suppress these in favor of Catholic dogma. The Chinese revered this as an ancient ritual but the Vatican considered it to be a religious exercise that conflicted with Catholic dogma. As a result, the Church made little progress in China in the late 19th and early 20th centuries.

Within a year of his election, Pope Pius XII made a dramatic change in policy. At his request, the Sacred Congregation of the Propagation of Faith issued new instruction on December 8, 1939, by which Chinese customs were no longer considered "superstitious" but an honourable way of esteeming one's relatives and therefore permitted to Catholic Christians. The Papal decree changed the ecclesiastical situation in China. The Nationalist Government of China established diplomatic relations with the Vatican in June 1942, with the first Minister presenting his credentials in January 1943. As the Church began to flourish, Pius established a local ecclesiastical hierarchy; he received Archbishop Thomas Tien Ken-sin SVD into the Sacred College of Cardinals and later elevated him to the See of Peking.

Church in 1949 

After WWII, about four million Chinese were members of the Catholic faith. This was less than one percent of the population but numbers rapidly increased. In 1949, there existed 20 archdioceses, 39 apostolic prefectures, 3080 foreign missionaries, and 2557 Chinese priests.

But the victory of the communist forces in 1949 and establishment of their government ended these early advances. The Nationalists went to the island of Taiwan. The government resisted relations with Rome and encouraged the persecution of thousands of clergy and faithful in China. It formed a "patriotic" Chinese Church, appointing the clergy and hierarchy. Since that time, the persecuted Catholic Church survives with a small fraction of its mid-20th century numbers and operates secretly "underground". The losses were considerable. For example, in 1948, the Catholic Church operated some 254 orphanages and 196 hospitals with 81,628 beds.

Persecution 

On October 1, 1949, Mao Zedong officially declared the founding of the People's Republic of China. Its constitution from September 1949 guaranteed all vital freedoms, including the freedom of religion, and prohibited discrimination against believers. However, the government was committed to its ideological vision of Marxism, which was very hostile to religion and supported its eradication. The communist party quickly equated religious affiliation as a test of political and ideological loyalty. It was especially hostile to religious bodies that it saw as outside of its control, as it considered the Catholic Church to be because of its relation to the Vatican and pope.

In Chinese cities, tolerance was practiced towards the Christian churches; but in rural areas, persecution began in 1950. New laws against counter-revolutionary activities from July 23, 1950, and February 1951  created legal tools for going after "enemies of the people". The Catholic clergy struggled with increased supervision over their activities. Bishops and priests were forced to engage in degrading menial jobs in order to earn their living.

Following the outbreak of the Korean War, in which western nations such as the United States played a primary role, foreign missionaries (most of whom were westerners) were accused of being foreign agents, ready to turn the country over to imperialist forces. They were expelled from China and have never been allowed to return. The government confiscated mission properties. It refrained from jailing or executing Catholics in large numbers, as it feared an international war with the Western powers. The expulsion of foreign missionaries was intended to symbolize China's liberation from foreign imperialism.

The 'Preparatory Committee of the Oppose American and Aid Korea Three-Self Reform Movement of the Christian Church' was founded for the purpose of denouncing western missionaries in China. All churches were required to demonize foreign missionaries (even ones they had worked with for decades), and Chinese Christians who refused to comply were forced to enroll in political study sessions.

Y.T. Wu in July 1950 led a delegation on behalf of nineteen Protestant churches to meet with Premier Zhou Enlai. They jointly drafted a statement calling for Christian support for the government. Thus, the Three-Self Patriotic Movement was created and Christian communities in China severed all ties to foreign groups. YT Wu later became the chairman of the Three-Self organization in 1954. The official policy forbade Chinese religious entities from being under the control of foreign entities. This proved especially difficult for Roman Catholics, since the pope was considered such a foreign entity.

The Catholic Church was considered extremely threatening due to its hierarchical structure, its nationwide networks, and its ability to block government penetration. China demanded Catholics give their full allegiance to the state, superseding allegiance to the Pope; political neutrality was not an option.

Pope Pius XII replied to these attacks and persecutions in his encyclical Evangelii praecones, which concerned Catholic missions all over the world but includes his views on the new situation in China:

In 1951, the papal nuncio, Archbishop Riberi, was expelled from China. The Chinese government then formed the Three Autonomies Movement, to oversee Catholic leadership, finances and teaching. Since the bishops interpreted this as a hostile attempt to organize the clergy and abandon the Holy See under the excuse of patriotism and nationalism, they objected. By 1953, many Chinese and foreign bishops and priests and lay persons were arrested, many of whom died in jail. Exact figures were not available.

Papal replies 

Pope Pius XII, in his encyclical Ad Sinarum gentem on October 7, 1954, warned the Chinese pastors that a national church would no longer be Catholic. He took a flexible stand on financial and organizational autonomy, stating that the Church viewed missionary and financial aid activities always as transitional. The training of domestic institutions and the formation of native clergy was therefore always the priority. At the same time one should not belittle the generosity of other Christians, who finance missionary activities. Foreign priests came in the name of Christ to China, and not as agents of hostile powers. Regarding the autonomy to teach, he agreed, it ought to differ according to place and conform, when possible, to the nature and particular character of the Chinese people, and to its ancient traditional customs:

In 1955, a mass arrest took place in the Shanghai diocese by the Chinese government. In one night on September 8, 1955, more than 200 clergy and faithful, including Bishop Ignatius Kung Pin-Mei, the Bishop of Shanghai, who refused to support "the Three Autonomies" movements to be independent of the Holy See, were arrested.

Chinese Patriotic Catholic Association 

In July 1957, Chinese delegates founded the Chinese Patriotic Catholic Association, breaking Vatican ties, since Rome was considered an instrument of American capitalism and aggression. Long "voluntary re-education courses" followed for clergy and lay people. Priests and bishops were encouraged to study Marxism–Leninism, the teachings of Chairman Mao, and the policies in order to give educated instruction to the Chinese people every Sunday. Counter-revolutionary elements were clergy who refused to participate in the patriotic program  The Bishop of Canton, Dominicus Tang, was among the most prominent "counter-revolutionaries". Since 1957 he was under house arrest, interrupted only by "confessional meetings" lasting between two and four hours. Arrested on February 5, 1958, he was accused of preaching from the encyclical Ad Sinarum gentem of Pope Pius XII. Other bishops were jailed and tried or exiled, if foreign born. After all bishops were removed the government declared the sees vacant and installed its own candidates. March 24 and 26, 1958, patriotic bishops took over the dioceses of Hankau and Wuchang. Others followed, after the rightful Catholic bishops were taken out and their legitimate representatives jailed as well, despite the vigorous protests of Pope Pius XII. Foreign missionaries were expelled; the fate of most domestic religious is not known.

The last encyclical of Pope Pius XII 

With his encyclical Ad Apostolorum principis, Pope Pius XII protested this renewed persecution. The radical break with Rome is visible. The encyclical asks, why faithful, good Catholics become schismatic and concludes that month-long, unending re-education courses and physical and psychological correction methods were inhuman but effective. Many were forced to make "voluntary confessions", live in education camps, others were dragged before degrading People Counts. Therefore, the Pontiff admits, the Church, in the short term at least, is facing darkness. But she continues to possess the powers of protest, prayer and full confidence in God. In his last encyclical, Pope Pius XII blesses and comforts those who, remained faithful to the Holy See:

Pope Pius XII, writings on China 

 1.	Instruction of the Sacred Congregation of the Propagation of Faith on mission related issues AAS 1939, 269
 2.	Instruction of the Sacred Congregation of the Propagation of Faith concerning Chinese rites AAS 1940, 24
 3.	Christmas Message December 24, 1945, AAS 1946, 15
 4.	Allocution to the new Cardinals February 2, 1946 AAS 1946, 141
 5.	Beatification of twenty-nine Chinese Martyrs, November 27, 1946, AAS 1947, 307
 6.	Apostolic Letter Cupimus Imprimis, January 18, 1952, AAS 1952, 153
 7.	Encyclical Ad Sinarum gentem, October 7, 1954, AAS 1955, 5
 8.	Address to Historians August 9, 1955 AAS 1955, 672
 9.	Encyclical Ad Apostolorum principis, June 29, 1958, AAS 1958, 601

References

 Acta Apostolicae Sedis (AAS), Roma, Vaticano 1922-1960
 Owen Chadwick, The Christian Church in the Cold War, London 1993
 Richard Cardinal Cushing, Pope Pius XII, St. Paul Editions, Boston, 1959
 Victor Dammertz OSB, "Ordensgemeinschaften und Säkularinstitute", in Handbuch der Kirchengeschichte, VII, Herder, Freiburg, 1979, 355-380
 A Galter, Rotbuch der verfolgten Kirchen, Paulus Verlag, Recklinghausen, 1957,
 Alberto Giovannetti, Pio XII parla alla Chiesa del Silenzio, Editrice Ancona, Milano, 1959, German translation, Der Papst spricht zur Kirche des Schweigens, Paulus Verlag, Recklinghausen, 1959
 Herder Korrespondenz Orbis Catholicus, Freiburg, 1946–1961
 Pio XII Discorsi e Radiomessagi, Roma Vaticano, 1939–1959,
 Jan Olav Smit, Pope Pius XII, London, Burns Oates & Washbourne LTD, 1951

Sources 

Catholicism in China
China–Holy See relations
Catholic Church in China
Pope Pius XII foreign relations
Persecution of Catholics during the pontificate of Pope Pius XII
China